Behavioral Sciences & the Law is a quarterly peer-reviewed academic journal covering the intersection of the law and behavioral sciences. It was established in 1983 and is published by John Wiley & Sons. The journal is edited by Charles Patrick Ewing (University at Buffalo Law School), Alan R. Felthous (Saint Louis University School of Medicine) and Christopher Slobogin (Vanderbilt Law School). According to the Journal Citation Reports, the journal has a 2020 impact factor of 2.103.

References

External links

Law journals
Quarterly journals
Publications established in 1983
Wiley (publisher) academic journals
English-language journals
Forensic psychology journals